Mohammad Daud (born 1 May 1943) was the 1st Commander of the Royal Brunei Armed Forces (RBAF) from 1985 until 1990, the 3rd Minister of Culture, Youth and Sports (MCYS) from 2005 until 2008, and the Minister of Energy from 2008 until 2010.

Biography

Early life and education 
Mohammad was born in Brunei on 1 May 1943. He attended the British Army Staff College, Camberley in 1971 during the middle of his military service. He studied for a year at the Royal College of Defence Studies in London in 1985.

Military career 
An announcement that there was a position available for officer cadets to train at the Federation Military College in Malaya for two years was made early in December 1960 by the neighborhood newspaper and radio station. The journey of the "three musketeers" had just begun. A panel of four officers from the Royal Federation of Malaya Armed Forces interrogated the 17 young men during the Tasek Lama selection process, which took place in the gymnasium of Sultan Omar 'Ali Saifuddien (SOAS), in the middle of December. Three people were chosen out of the seven who were shortlisted; they were Sulaiman Damit, Mohammad Daud, and Ibnu Apong. On 24 December 1960, they took their oaths before the magistrate and left Brunei the next day through Singapore.

Mohammad received his appointment as a Second Lieutenant in December 1962. Afterwards, he had a variety of command and staff positions in the recently founded Brunei Malay Regiment. He was promoted to the rank of Major on 1 July 1969. He held positions such as battalion commander, Commander of the training center, Deputy Commander of the RBAF, and lastly Commander of the RBAF until his retirement in the rank of Major General in 1990. In the early and late 1980s, he actively engaged in the Pacific Armies Management Seminars (PAMS) and served as the delegation leader for Brunei to the seminars in Honolulu, Seoul, and Bangkok.

Political career 
He served as a Member of the Brunei Legislative Council from 1974 to 1983. Also, since 1991, he has been a member of the Privy Council, the Government's highest advisory body. He attended the General Assembly and Conferences of the ASEAN Inter-Parliamentary Organisation (AIPO) as a representative of Brunei in Singapore in 1982, Bangkok in 1991, Jakarta in 1992, Bali in 1997, Kuala Lumpur in 1998, Manila in 1999, Bangkok in 2001, Hanoi in 2002, and Jakarta in 2003. On 24 May 2005, it announced by Sultan Hassanal Bolkiah that he would take on the role of Minister of Culture, Youth and Sports. Pehin Mohammad was later reappointed as the Minister of Energy on 22 August 2008, and would last until 29 May 2010.

Diplomatic career 
From September 1993 until May 1995, Mohammed served as both the non-resident ambassador to Morocco and Egypt. When Brunei hosted the APEC Summit in November 2000, he was appointed the Executive Director for Logistics in February 2000. On 14 February 1996, he presented his credentials to Secretary-General Boutros Boutros-Ghali that afternoon in his capacity as the new Permanent Representative of Brunei to the United Nations (UN). He represented Brunei as its permanent representative to the UN in New York from February 1996 to April 1997.

Later life 
Prior to being chosen as a Minister in the MCYS, Mohammed served as the Chairman of the Brunei Economic Development Board. Moreover, he is also the President of the Royal Brunei Flying Club, the Deputy Chairman II of the Board of Directors of the Sultan Haji Hassanal Bolkiah Foundation, a member of the National Committee of the Malay Islamic Monarchy (MIB), the Chairman of the Employees' Trust Fund Board, and a member of the Board of Directors of the Islamic Bank of Brunei (Tabung Amanah Pekerja). As of 2015, he was the Chairman of the Takaful Brunei Board of Directors. Recently, he became the Co-Patron of the Kampong Tanah Jambu Mosque.

Personal life 
Mohammad is married and had four children.

Honours 
Mohammad was bestowed the title of Yang Dimuliakan (His Excellency) Pehin Orang Kaya Seri Dewa. Moreover, he has earned the following honours; 

  Order of Pahlawan Negara Brunei First Class (PSPNB) – Dato Seri Pahlawan
  Order of Paduka Seri Laila Jasa Second Class (DSLJ) – Dato Seri Laila Jasa
  Order of Setia Negara Brunei Second Class (DSNB) – Dato Setia
  Order of Seri Paduka Mahkota Brunei Second Class Class (DPMB) – Dato Paduka
  Sultan Hassanal Bolkiah Medal (PHBS)
  Armed Forces Service Medal (PBLI)
  Silver Jubilee Medal – (5 October 1992)
  Royal Brunei Armed Forces Silver Jubilee Medal – (31 May 1986)
  Proclamation of Independence Medal – (1 January 1984)
  General Service Medal (Armed Forces)
  Long Service Medal (Armed Forces)

References 

Living people
Bruneian military leaders
1943 births
Bruneian Muslims
Graduates of the Staff College, Camberley
Graduates of the Royal College of Defence Studies
Members of the Legislative Council of Brunei
Ambassadors of Brunei to Egypt
Ambassadors of Brunei to Morocco
Permanent Representatives of Brunei to the United Nations